Anthony Robin Schneider is an operatic bass from Austria and New Zealand, based in Germany at the Oper Frankfurt. He has appeared in leading roles internationally, such as Truffaldino in Ariadne auf Naxos at the Santa Fe Opera, Sarastro in Mozart's Die Zauberflöte at the Houston Grand Opera, and Fafner in Wagner's Das Rheingold at the Tiroler Festspiele in Erl.

Career 
Born in Oberpullendorf, Austria, Schneider studied at the University of Auckland and from 2013 at the Academy of Vocal Arts in Philadelphia. He was a member of the opera studio of the Houston Grand Opera in the 2017/18 season, and of the Santa Fe Opera. He appeared first at the Oper Frankfurt as the Innkeeper in Schreker's Der ferne Klang on 31 March 2019, directed by Damiano Michieletto who also made his house debut. The opera had been premiered in Frankfurt in 1912, and not been performed after World War II. A reviewer noted Schneider's convincing portrayal of the aggressive-lustful character. The production, with Sebastian Weigle conducting, was recorded in 2021. Schneider became a member of the ensemble in Frankfurt with the 2019/20 season. Roles at the house have included Bartolo in Mozart's Le nozze di Figaro, Heinrich in Wagner's Lohengrin, Ibn-Hakia in Tchaikovsky's Iolanta, Panas in Rimsky-Korsakov's Christmas Eve, and Cirillo in Giordano's Fedora.

Schneider appeared as the Ghost of Hector in Les Troyens by Berlioz at the Vienna State Opera, Truffaldino in Ariadne auf Naxos by Richards Strauss at the Santa Fe Opera, and as Grenvil in Verdi's La Traviata and Sarastro in Mozart's Die Zauberflöte at the Houston Grand Opera. He has performed in Wagner's Der Ring des Nibelungen at the Tiroler Festspiele in Erl, as Fafner in Das Rheingold and Hunding in Die Walküre.

Schneider recorded Beethoven's Ninth Symphony in 2019 with Sabina Cvilak, Kristin Darragh, Oliver Johnston, the Voices New Zealand Chamber Choir and the New Zealand Symphony Orchestra conducted by Edo de Waart. On 10 March 2022, during the 2022 Russian invasion of Ukraine, that recording was broadcast again by Radio New Zealand. The same day, he was the bass soloist in the symphony's final in a charity concert for Ukraine at the Alte Oper in Frankfurt, performed with Monika Buczkowska, Judita Nagyová and AJ Glueckert, members of Frankfurt choirs, and the hr-Sinfonieorchester conducted by Juraj Valčuha. It was broadcast by Hessischer Rundfunk.

References

External links
 
 Anthony Robin Schneider Bass operabase.com
 Anthony Robin Schneider / Bass (management) moartists.com 2022
 

Living people
People from Auckland
Operatic basses
21st-century New Zealand male opera singers
Year of birth missing (living people)